Coconut production plays an important role in the national economy of Indonesia. According to figures published in December 2009 by the Food and Agriculture Organization of the United Nations, it is the world's second largest producer of coconuts, producing 15,319,500 tonnes in 2009.

References

Indonesia
Agriculture in Indonesia